The Ambassador from New Zealand to South Korea is New Zealand's foremost diplomatic representative in the Republic of Korea, and in charge of New Zealand's diplomatic mission in South Korea.

The embassy is located in Seoul, South Korea's capital city.  New Zealand has maintained a resident ambassador in South Korea since 1976.  The Ambassador to South Korea is concurrently accredited to North Korea.

List of heads of mission

Ambassadors to South Korea

Non-resident ambassadors, resident in Japan
 Ted Taylor (1962–1965)
 John Scott (1965–1969)
 Hunter Wade (1969–1972)
 Tom Larkin (1972–1976)

Resident ambassadors
 Ted Farnon (1976–1980)
 David Holborow (1980–1984)
 Chris Butler (1984–1990)
 Peter Kennedy (1993–1995)
 Gerald McGhie (1996–1999)
 Roy Ferguson (1999–2002)
 David Taylor (2002–2006)
 Jane Coombs (2006–2008)
 Richard Mann (2009–2012)
Patrick Rata (2012–2014)
Clare Fearnley (2015-2017), cross-accredited to Pyongyang
Phillip Turner (2018–present)

References
 New Zealand Heads of Overseas Missions: South Korea.  New Zealand Ministry of Foreign Affairs and Trade.  Retrieved on 2008-03-29.

South Korea, Ambassadors from New Zealand to
 
New Zealand